Relizane District is a district of Relizane Province, Algeria.

The city is mainly based on the Flittas, a descendant of the Arab Hilal.

Districts of Relizane Province